was a warlord of the Japanese province of Yamato during the Sengoku period of the 16th century. Junshō was the son of Tsutsui Junkō. Through one time in the Sengoku Period, Junshō was destined to ascend to the position of daimyō over the province of Yamato.

Junshō's death was kept secret for three years. A blind monk from Nara named Mokuami, whose physical appearance resembled Junshō, was used as a puppet to conceal his death.  Meanwhile, Junshō's son Tsutsui Junkei has grown up and took his father's position. Mokuami, who has no value any more, was sent back to Nara as an ordinary priest.

Daimyo
1523 births
1550 deaths